Drifting Clouds may refer to:

 Drifting Clouds, 1887 Japanese novel by Futabatei Shimei 
 Drifting Clouds (film), 1996 Finnish film by Aki Kaurismäki